National Tertiary Route 704, or just Route 704 (or ) is a National Road Route of Costa Rica, located in the Alajuela province.

Description
In Alajuela province the route covers San Ramón canton (San Juan, Concepción districts), Naranjo canton (San José district).

References

Highways in Costa Rica